Samo (Sane, San, Sa), also known as Mande Samo, is a dialect cluster of Niger-Congo languages spoken in Burkina Faso and Mali.

Varieties
Intelligibility between Samo varieties is low. The following have been coded as separate languages:

Matya Samo, spoken in Kossi Province, Sourou Province (Nouna and Solenzo areas) and Mali
Maya Samo, spoken in Sourou Province, Yatenga Province, and Zondoma Province
Southern/Maka Samo, spoken in Nayala Province (Nouna and Solenzo areas); Sourou Province; Sanguie Province; Passore Province

Demographics
Samo dialect populations and locations:

List of Samo villages organised by department and dialect:

Sample vocabulary
Sample basic vocabulary of Samo dialects:

Writing System

Notes and references

Mande languages
Languages of Burkina Faso